John McGeever (February 14, 1939 – December 5, 2022) was an American professional football player who was a cornerback in the American Football League (AFL).

McGeever was drafted in the 7th round by the Denver Broncos in the 1962 AFL Draft after playing college football for the Auburn University. From 1962 to 1965, McGeever played for the Broncos, then for the Miami Dolphins in 1966.

McGeever died on December 5, 2022, at the age of 83.

References

1939 births
2022 deaths
People from Bogalusa, Louisiana
Players of American football from Louisiana
American football cornerbacks
Denver Broncos (AFL) players
Miami Dolphins players
Auburn Tigers football players
American Football League players